is a city located in Chiba Prefecture. , the city had an estimated population of 88,330 in 40,869 households and a population density of 880 persons per km². The total area of the city is

Geography
Mobara is located in an inland area of north-central Bōsō Peninsula, about 25 kilometers from the prefectural capital at Chiba and 50 to 60 kilometers from the center of Tokyo. Most of the city is the Kujukuri Plain, and the mountains in the western part of the city are formed by the Bōsō Hill Range. The elevation of the city is about 8 to 9 meters above sea level in the lowlands of the southeast, about 11 meters in the city, and 20 to 100 meters in the west, with a maximum of 117.7 meters. In some areas, land subsidence due to human factors such as pumping of surface groundwater and natural gas brackish water has become a problem, and subsidence of up to about 10 cm has been observed.

Surrounding municipalities
Chiba Prefecture
Midori-ku, Chiba
Ichihara
Nagara
Chōnan
Shirako
Ōamishirasato

Climate
Mobara has a humid subtropical climate (Köppen Cfa) characterized by warm summers and cool winters with light to no snowfall.

Demographics
Per Japanese census data, the population of Mobara peaked around the year 2000 and has declined since.

History

Early history
Mobara was settled from the earliest times, as evidenced by archaeological sites and shell mounds dating from the Jōmon period and Yayoi periods. The city also has examples of kofun, or burial mounds, from the Kofun period. The area was the location of at least two shōen estates, the Mobara-sō and the Tachibana-sō, in the Heian period. At the beginning of the Edo period, in 1591, an extensive land survey was carried out by the Tokugawa clan.

Modern history
The town of Mobara was created during the early Meiji period establishment of the modern municipalities system on April 1, 1889 in Chōsei District. The Bōsō Tetsudo, now the JR Sotobō Line, was established in 1897 between Ichinomiya and Ōami Station in present-day Ōamishirasato. Mobara Station was one station established on the line, thus connecting Mobara to the wider rail network. In 1909 a handcar system ran from Mobara Station and Chōnan. The handcar railroad was constructed and operated by the prefecture.

World War II
A base for the 252 Air Group of the Imperial Japanese Navy (IJN), a fighter aircraft unit, was established in Mobara. In 1941, by order of the IJN, 100 residences and their associated farmland, schools, town halls, police substations, temples, and shrines were forcibly confiscated without warning to build the base. Mobara Airfield was completed using a kinrō dōin group that consisted of the forced labor of Korean residents in Japan and students from Chōsei Middle School students in 1943. The airfield was located on the east banks of the small Aku River, directly to the east of Mobara Station along the present-day JR East Sotobō Line, and consisted of a runway and 20 structures, some of them concealed underground. Tokubetsu kōgekitai, or kamikaze units, were sent from Mobara Airfield to the IJN Kokubu Air Corps in present-day Kirishima, Kagoshima Prefecture to attack American forces off Okinawa. The United States confiscated the airfield shortly after the surrender of Japan in 1945. Remains of the runway, approximately ten airfield structures, and a tunnel are now on the property of the Mitsui Chemicals.

Post-war history

At the end of World War II, the 113th Cavalry Regiment of the United States Army occupied the Mobara Airfield. The Japan Self-Defense Forces attempted to reoccupy the base in 1954, but after organized efforts by residents, agricultural organizations, the town and prefectural governments, the plans were abandoned the following year. The site was used to build Mobara Middle School for the rapidly expanding population of the town.

On April 1, 1952, Mobara Town expanded by annexation of neighboring villages of Tōgō, Toyoda, Ninomiya-Hongō, Tsurue, and Gogō and was elevated to city status. On April 1, 1955, Mobara annexed the town of Chōnan.  On May 1, 1972, Mobara merged with the neighboring town of Honnō. On December 11, 1990, the city was hit by an F-3 tornado, which killed one person, injured 78, and damaged or destroyed 1,747 homes in the city.

Government
Mobara has a mayor-council form of government with a directly elected mayor and a unicameral city council of 22 members. Mobara contributes two members to the Chiba Prefectural Assembly. In terms of national politics, the city is part of Chiba 11th district of the lower house of the Diet of Japan.

Economy
Mobara serves as a regional commerce center for surrounding Chōsei District. The economy of Mobara is dominated by electronics manufacturing. Futaba Corporation, a major manufacturer of radio control models and toys, is headquartered in Mobara. Natural gas production is also important to the city; Kanto Natural Gas Development Co., Ltd. and Otaki Gas Co., Ltd. have headquarters here. Chemical production, centered on Mitsui Chemicals, is the largest producer of iodine in Japan. 40% of the total world production of iodine is produced in Mobara. Much land in Mobara is still used for rice production. Additionally, negi, or the ubiquitous Welsh onion of Japanese cuisine, is an important agricultural product.

Education
Mobara has 14 public elementary schools and six public middle schools operated by the city government, and three public high schools operated by the Chiba Prefectural Board of Education. There is also one private high school.

Transportation

Railway
 JR East – Sotobō Line
  -  -

Highway

Local attractions
Tachibana Jinja - a Shintō shrine connected with the Yamatotakeru mythology, the ninomiya of Kazusa Province
Nyoirin-ji - a Nichiren Buddhist temple

Tanabata festival
A popular annual event in Mobara is the Tanabata festival, during which a wide array of stalls and parades dominate much of the city's central shopping district. While the rest of Japan usually celebrates Tanabata on July 7, the Mobara festival is held in late July so as to coincide with school holidays.

Sister city relations
 Salisbury, South Australia, Australia (since May 25, 2002)

Notable people from Mobara
Naoki Kawano, actor and musician
Ishii Kikujirō, prewar diplomat and cabinet minister 
Michitaka Kobayashi, voice actor
Yuko Ogura, gravure idol
Yōko Shōji, manga artist

References

External links

Official Website 

 
Cities in Chiba Prefecture